The 1954 Colorado A&M Aggies football team represented Colorado State College of Agriculture and Mechanic Arts in the Skyline Conference during the 1954 college football season.  In their eighth season under head coach Bob Davis, the Aggies compiled a 3–7 record (3–4 against Skyline opponents), finished sixth in the Skyline Conference, and were outscored by opponents by a total of 248 to 93.

Schedule

References

Colorado AandM
Colorado State Rams football seasons
Colorado AandM Aggies football